Rattu Cantonment is a century plus old cantonment located at Rattu in Astore district of Gilgit Baltistan, Pakistan. It is located at an altitude of 9000 ft above sea level. During summer, the weather remains pleasant but winters are very cold and temperatures vary between ~20 °C to -35 °C. Rattu receives three to six feet snow during winter.

The Army High Altitude School of Pakistan Army is based at Rattu Cantonment. The cantonment is surrounded by two rivers namely Kalapani and Mir Malik. Mountain craft training sites, river crossing sites and ski slopes are located within the cantonment. It also serves as the army base camp to communicate across other northern regions of Pakistan.

See also
 Northern Light Infantry
 X Corps
 Force Command Northern Areas
 Special Security Division

References

External links
  Northern Area Command

Cantonments of Pakistan
Astore District
Pakistan Army airbases